The 12th Pan American Games were held in Mar del Plata, Argentina from March 11 to March 26, 1995.

Medals

Bronze

Results by events

Athletics
Brian Wellman
Terrance Armstrong
Troy Douglas
Jennifer Fisher

Cycling
Elliot Hubbard

Football
Timothy Figureido
Shawn Smith
Kimandi Binns
Sean Simmons
Andrew Rahman
Dean Bailey
Karl Roberts
Dano Outerbridge
Quincy Aberdeen
Shawn Simons
Janeiro Turcker
Jermaine Belboda
Jahmah Samuels
Nakia Smith
Ottis Steede
Steve Mendes
Dwayne Adams

Karate
Alton Wharton
Dwayne Williams
Eugene Ford
Bobby Smith
Roger Trimm
Nigel Williams

Sailing
Malcolm Smith
Peter Bromby
Lee White
Stephen Dickinson
Heath Foggo
Elizabeth Walker
Paula Lewin
Blythe Walker

Water Ski
Kent Richardson

See also
 Bermuda at the 1996 Summer Olympics

References
Bermuda Olympic Committee

Nations at the 1995 Pan American Games
P
1995